Frobisher is a village in the Canadian province of Saskatchewan within the Rural Municipality of Coalfields No. 4 and Census Division No. 1. It has an elevation of 576 metres (1891 feet) above sea level.

Frobisher is located along Highway 18, in the heart of south-east Saskatchewan's oil patch. Many pumpjacks and oil batteries are found in the area. Within the village, there are oil field related businesses, a post office, a restaurant/convenience store, and Frobisher United Church.

History 
Frobisher was originally known as Frobyshire but due to an error in the original village plans, it had to be renamed. In 1903, there were four grain elevators, each with a capacity of 25,000 bushels, one of which still stands. Frobisher was built at the cross-roads of two rail lines, the Canadian Pacific Railway Souris Line and the Grand Trunk Regina-Boundary Branch Line. The Grand Trunk line was a Canadian National Railway line, which is now gone as CN had issued a notice of discontinuance for the section which went from Northgate to Lampman on 16 October 2007. Frobisher was incorporated as a village on July 4, 1904.

Parks and recreation 
The closest park to Frobisher is Moose Creek Regional Park, 27 kilometres east. The park is located along the east side of Grant Devine Reservoir. While Frobisher no longer has an ice rink, the Frobisher Flyers were among the four founding teams of the Big 6 Hockey League. The Flyers never won a championship.

Demographics 

See also 
 List of communities in Saskatchewan
 Villages of Saskatchewan

References

External links 

Villages in Saskatchewan
Coalfields No. 4, Saskatchewan
Division No. 1, Saskatchewan